The Criminal, Cyber, Response, and Services Branch (CCRSB) is a service within the Federal Bureau of Investigation (FBI). The CCRSB is responsible for investigating financial crime, white-collar crime, violent crime, organized crime, public corruption, violations of individual civil rights, and drug-related crime. In addition, the Branch also oversees all computer-based crime related to counterterrorism, counterintelligence, and criminal threats against the United States.

Operation
The CCRSB deploys FBI agents, analysts, and computer scientists and uses traditional investigative techniques such as sources and wiretaps, surveillance, and forensics. CCRSB works in conjunction with other federal, state, and regional agencies from 56 field offices and at the National Cyber Investigative Joint Task Force (NCIJTF).

CCRSB operates a 24-hour cyber command center (CyWatch) where they combine the resources of the FBI and NCIJTF. In the event of a significant cyber intrusion, they provide connectivity to federal cyber centers, government agencies, FBI field offices, legal attachés, and the private sector. They also exchange information about cyber threats with the private sector through partnerships such as the Domestic Security Alliance Council, InfraGard, and the National Cyber-Forensics and Training Alliance (NCFTA).

CCRSB maintains overseas legal attaché offices to coordinate cyber investigations and address jurisdictional hurdles and differences in law with other countries while collaborating with cyber crime centers at Interpol and Europol.

The unit maintains a website called Cyber Shield Alliance (www.leo.gov) which provides access to cyber training and information for the public, and the means to report cyber incidents to the FBI.

The FBI reports that since 2002, they have seen an 80 percent increase in the number of computer intrusion investigations.

Leadership
Headed by an FBI executive assistant director, the CCRSB is responsible to the FBI Director through the Deputy Director.

The current CCRSB executive assistant director is Timothy Langan.

Organization
The CCRSB was formed by the unification of the FBI's various traditional crime fighting units.
FBI Critical Incident Response Group
FBI Criminal Investigative Division
FBI Cyber Division
FBI International Operations Division
FBI Victim Services Division

Future
It is speculated that the establishment of a National Security Branch and more traditional Criminal Investigations Branch within the FBI this will lead to the formation of "career paths" for FBI Special Agents; meaning that once a new agent has completed Special Agent Training at FBI Academy in Quantico, Virginia, and has completed the mandatory probationary period, that he or she will choose to go into the National Security Branch, or go into the "Criminal" part of the Bureau and focus on crimes such as organized crime, narcotics, civil rights violations, fraud, and violent crime. Some advocates of this new program say that this re-organization will help the fight against terrorism by making it less bureaucratic.

References

External links
Federal Bureau of Investigation website
Official Criminal, Cyber, Response, and Services Branch website

Federal Bureau of Investigation
United States intelligence agencies
Computer security organizations